Sunanda may refer to

People
 Sunanda K. Datta-Ray, Bengali journalist
 Sunanda Kumariratana (1860–1880), queen consort of Siam
 Sunanda Mahendra (born 1938), Sri Lankan writer
 Sunanda Murali Manohar (1957–2017), Indian-British film producer
 Sunanda Nair, Indian dancer
 Sunanda Patnaik (1934–2020), Indian classical singer
 Sunanda Pushkar (1962–2014), Indian businesswoman
 Sunanda Sharma (born 1992), Punjabi singer and actor
 Sunanda Sikdar (born 1951), Indian writer
 Sunanda (singer), South Indian playback singer in Tamil and Malayalam films active 1984 onwards

Other uses
 Sunanda Devi, mountain peak